Carvedilol, sold under the brand name Coreg among others, is a medication used to treat high blood pressure, congestive heart failure (CHF), and left ventricular dysfunction in people who are otherwise stable. For high blood pressure, it is generally a second-line treatment. It is taken by mouth.

Common side effects include dizziness, tiredness, joint pain, low blood pressure, nausea, and shortness of breath. Severe side effects may include bronchospasm. Safety during pregnancy or breastfeeding is unclear. Use is not recommended in those with liver problems. Carvedilol is a nonselective beta blocker and alpha-1 blocker. How it improves outcomes is not entirely clear but may involve dilation of blood vessels.

Carvedilol was patented in 1978 and approved for medical use in the United States in 1995. It is on the World Health Organization's List of Essential Medicines. It is available as a generic medication. In 2020, it was the 26th most commonly prescribed medication in the United States, with more than 23million prescriptions.

Medical uses
Carvedilol is indicated in the management of congestive heart failure (CHF), commonly as an adjunct to angiotensin-converting-enzyme inhibitor (ACE inhibitors) and diuretics. It has been clinically shown to reduce mortality and hospitalizations in people with CHF. The mechanism behind its positive effect when used long-term in clinically stable CHF patients is not fully understood, but is thought to contribute to remodeling of the heart, improving upon its structure and function.

Carvedilol reduces the risk of death, hospitalizations, and recurring heart attacks for patients with reduced heart function following a heart attack. Carvedilol has also been proven to reduce death and hospitalization in patients with severe heart failure.

In practice, carvedilol has been used in the treatment of uncomplicated hypertension, yet studies suggest it has relatively ineffective blood pressure-lowering effects when compared with other blood pressure-lowering therapies or other beta blockers.

Available forms
Carvedilol is available in the following forms:

 Oral tablet
 Extended-release (24-hour) oral capsule (approved by the FDA in 2006)

Contraindications
Carvedilol should not be used in patients with bronchial asthma or bronchospastic conditions due to increased  risk of bronchoconstriction. It should not be used in people with second- or third-degree atrioventricular block, sick sinus syndrome, severe bradycardia (unless a permanent pacemaker is in place), or a decompensated heart condition. People with severe hepatic impairment should use carvedilol with caution.

Side effects
The most common side effects (>10% incidence) of carvedilol include:

 Dizziness
 Fatigue
 Low blood pressure
 Diarrhea
 Weakness
 Slowed heart rate
 Weight gain
 Erectile dysfunction

Carvedilol is not recommended for people with uncontrolled bronchospastic disease (e.g. current asthma symptoms) as it can block receptors that assist in opening the airways.

Carvedilol may mask symptoms of low blood sugar, resulting in hypoglycemia unawareness. This is termed beta blocker induced hypoglycemia unawareness.

Pharmacology

Pharmacodynamics
Carvedilol is both a non-selective β-adrenergic receptor antagonist (β1, β2) and an α-adrenergic receptor antagonist (α1). The S(–) enantiomer accounts for the beta-blocking activity whereas the S(–) and R(+) enantiomers have alpha-blocking activity. The affinity (Ki) of carvedilol for the β-adrenergic receptors is 0.32 nM for the human β1-adrenergic receptor and 0.13 to 0.40 nM for the β2-adrenergic receptor.

Using rat proteins, carvedilol has shown affinity for a variety of targets including the β1-adrenergic receptor (Ki = 0.24–0.43 nM), β2-adrenergic receptor (Ki = 0.19–0.25 nM), α1-adrenergic receptor (Ki = 3.4 nM), α2-adrenergic receptor (Ki = 2,168 nM), 5-HT1A receptor (Ki = 3.4 nM), 5-HT2 receptor (Ki = 207 nM), H1 receptor (Ki = 3,034 nM), D2 receptor (Ki = 213 nM), μ-opioid receptor (Ki = 2,700 nM), veratridine site of voltage-gated sodium channels (IC50 = 1,260 nM), serotonin transporter (Ki = 528 nM), norepinephrine transporter (Ki = 2,406 nM), and dopamine transporter (Ki = 627 nM). It is an antagonist of the human 5-HT2A receptors with moderate affinity (Ki = 547 nM), although it is unclear if this is significant for its pharmacological actions given its much stronger activity at adrenergic receptors.

Carvedilol reversibly binds to β-adrenergic receptors on cardiac myocytes. Inhibition of these receptors prevents a response to the sympathetic nervous system, leading to decreased heart rate and contractility. This action is beneficial in heart failure patients where the sympathetic nervous system is activated as a compensatory mechanism. Carvedilol blockade of α1-adrenergic receptors causes vasodilation of blood vessels. This inhibition leads to decreased peripheral vascular resistance and an antihypertensive effect. There is no reflex tachycardia response due to carvedilol blockade of β1-adrenergic receptors on the heart.

Pharmacokinetics
Carvedilol is about 25% to 35% bioavailable following oral administration due to extensive first-pass metabolism. Absorption is slowed when administered with food, however, it does not show a significant difference in bioavailability. Taking carvedilol with food decreases the risk of orthostatic hypotension.

The majority of carvedilol is bound to plasma proteins (98%), mainly to albumin. Carvedilol is a basic, hydrophobic compound with a steady-state volume of distribution of 115 L. Plasma clearance ranges from 500 to 700 mL/min. Carvedilol is lipophilic and easily crosses the blood–brain barrier in animals, and hence is not thought to be peripherally selective.

The compound is metabolized by liver enzymes, CYP2D6 and CYP2C9 via aromatic ring oxidation and glucuronidation, then further conjugated by glucuronidation and sulfation. The three active metabolites exhibit only one-tenth of the vasodilating effect of the parent compound. However, the 4'-hydroxyphenyl metabolite is about 13-fold more potent in β-blockade than the parent.

The mean elimination half-life of carvedilol following oral administration ranges from 7 to 10 hours. The pharmaceutical product is a mix of two enantiomorphs, R(+)-carvedilol and  S(–)-carvedilol, with differing metabolic properties. R(+)-Carvedilol undergoes preferential selection for metabolism, which results in a fractional half-life of about 5 to 9 hours, compared with 7 to 11 hours for the S(-)-carvedilol fraction.

References

Further reading

External links

 

Alpha-1 blockers
Beta blockers
Carbazoles
Catechol ethers
GSK plc brands
Phenoxypropanolamines
World Health Organization essential medicines
Wikipedia medicine articles ready to translate